2009 World Cup may refer to:

2009 Alpine Skiing World Cup
2009 ICC World Twenty20
2009 Women's Cricket World Cup
2009 World Cup (men's golf)
Chess World Cup 2009
Football (soccer):
Youth: 2009 FIFA U-20 World Cup
Junior: 2009 FIFA U-17 World Cup
Club: 2009 FIFA Club World Cup
Beach soccer: 2009 FIFA Beach Soccer World Cup

See also
 2009 Continental Championships (disambiguation)
 2009 World Championships (disambiguation)
 2009 World Junior Championships (disambiguation)
 2009 ICC World Cup Qualifier, cricket tournament